is a passenger railway station  located in Kita-ku Kobe, Hyōgo Prefecture, Japan. It is operated by the private transportation company, Kobe Electric Railway (Shintetsu).

Lines

Station layout
The station consists of two elevated island platforms, with the station building underneath. The effective length of each platform is 6 cars, but due to the position of the ATS to prevent accidental departure, a maximum of 4 cars can be used on Platforms 1 and 2 in the direction of Sanda, and a maximum of 5 cars can be used in Platforms 3 and 4 in the Shinkaichi direction.

Platforms

Adjacent stations

History
On 18 December 1928, the station was opened with the opening of the Sanda Line.

Passenger statistics
In fiscal 2019, the station was used by an average of 9,396 passengers daily

Surrounding area
Hyogo Prefectural Route 15 Kobe Sanda Line (Arima Highway)
Kita-ku Central Building
Kobe City Kita-kui Ward Office

See also
List of railway stations in Japan

References

External links 

 Official home page 

Railway stations in Kobe
Railway stations in Japan opened in 1928